The Chief of the Naval Staff is the head of the Naval operations and the administrative head in the Ghana Navy. The current Chief of Naval Staff is Rear Admiral Issah Yakubu.

List of officeholders

References

Ghanaian military personnel
Ghana Navy personnel
Ghana
Chiefs of Naval Staff (Ghana)
Ghanaian Heads of Security Services